Andrew Davison (December 18, 1886 – April 6, 1963) was a Canadian politician, printer and 24th Mayor of Calgary. He served as alderman from 1922 to 1926 and mayor from 1929 to 1945 - his 15 year term as mayor is the longest in the city's history. He also served as a member of the Alberta Legislature 1940 to 1948.

Early life
Andrew Davison was born on December 18, 1886 in Moneymore, County Londonderry, Ireland to Andrew Davison and Clara Williamson. He arrived in Alberta in 1895 and received his education in both Edmonton and Calgary, and attended Business College in Winnipeg. He married Effie Huggins on December 3, 1912.

Prior to entering politics, Davison worked as a printer, a linotype operator and publisher and was associated with the Calgary Albertan, the News Telegram, and Calgary Herald from after the war to 1929. During the First World War from 1914–1918, he served overseas in the London War Office as a Pay Sergeant with the Canadian Army Pay Corps, he was unable to enlist for active combat due to an "eyesight handicap". He served as Pay Master of the Second Battalion, Calgary Highlanders, with the rank of captain, during the Second World War.

Political career

Andrew Davison was first elected to Calgary City Council in the 1921 Calgary municipal election as a Labour candidate, his election occurred while he was working at the Calgary Herald as a printer. He served four terms as Alderman from 1922 to 1926.

Then in 1929 he was acclaimed as mayor of Calgary on November 12, 1929. He was re-elected Mayor another seven times, serving a total of sixteen years as the City's Chief Magistrate, a record unequalled before or since.

During Davison's term as mayor, the ambitious and controversial Glenmore Dam waterworks system was completed. The Glenmore Dam and other capital projects placed the City of Calgary heavily into debt, and in 1937 Davison along with Jules Fortain and former mayor Frederick Ernest Osborne proposed the "Fortain Plan" which consolidated the municipality's debt, and shifted the financial burden to future years. This financial adjustment enabled Calgary to afford upgrades to power and transportation services.

Under Davison the City of Calgary began paying Aldermen for their services, with $50 per standing committee meeting attended with a yearly cap of $250. In 1945, due to ill health, Davison resigned his position as Mayor of Calgary but kept his seat in the Legislature until his term was over.

Davison attempted to enter federal politics in 1935, contesting the Bow River district for the House of Commons of Canada in the 1935 Canadian federal election as the Conservative candidate. He was defeated by Social Credit candidate Charles Edward Johnston.

Davison ran for the Legislative Assembly of Alberta in the 1940 Alberta general election in the Calgary district as the leader of the Independent Movement, which sought to unite the opposition to Social Credit.  He was elected and then re-elected in 1944 Alberta general election. He continued to serve as both mayor and a member in the Legislature. He did not run again in 1948.

Following his resignation from the Alberta Legislature, Davison retired to Vancouver, where he died several years later on April 6, 1963 at the age of 76.

Honours
The Andrew Davison Building, a 13 floor building located at 133 6 Avenue SE and the former home of the Calgary Police Service headquarters is named in his honour.
There is also a Calgary Board of Education school named after him: Andrew Davison School.

References

Mayors of Calgary
Conservative Party of Canada (1867–1942) candidates for the Canadian House of Commons
1886 births
1963 deaths
Independent Alberta MLAs
People from County Londonderry
Irish emigrants to Canada (before 1923)
20th-century Canadian politicians